Karel Lomecký (4 November 1914 – 13 December 2001) was a Czechoslovak sprint canoer who competed in the late 1940s. He won a bronze medal in the K-4 1000 m event at the 1948 ICF Canoe Sprint World Championships in London. Lomecký also finished seventh in the K-2 10000 m event at the 1948 Summer Olympics in London.

References

External links
 
 

1914 births
2001 deaths
Czech male canoeists
Czechoslovak male canoeists
Olympic canoeists of Czechoslovakia
Canoeists at the 1948 Summer Olympics
ICF Canoe Sprint World Championships medalists in kayak